Egypt has a centralised system of local government officially called local administration as it is a branch of the Executive.  The country is divided into twenty-seven governorates, the top tier of local administration. A governorate is administered by a governor, who is appointed by the President of Egypt and serves at the president's discretion.

Governors have the civilian rank of minister and report directly to the prime minister, who chairs the Board of Governors (majlis al-muhafzin) and meets with them on a regular basis. The Minister of Local Development coordinates the governors and their governorate's budgets.

Overview
Egypt generally has four tiers of local administration units and one economic level that does not have any administrative duties:

0. Economic regions (non administrative, comprising governorates)

 Governorates, in some cases city-states where the governor is also the head of the city.
 Markaz (county, pl. marakiz) and city (as capital) where head of markaz is head of the city, or independent city (madina, usually large cities e.g. Giza, Shubra al-Kheima).
 Districts (ahyaa, singl. hayy, subdivisions of cities) and main villages (subdivisions of marakiz).
 Qism (police ward), either covering a district or subdivisions of one, used for policing, and census purposes.
 Shiakha (census block, urban), affiliated village/hamlet (qarya tabi'a, izba, nag'a).
In addition to these tiers are New Urban Communities, which are satellite cities that are built and operated by the national level New Urban Communities Authority (NUCA). Its chairman, the Minister of Housing, Utilities and Urban Communities issues planning permits and oversees the communities, while the appointed city agency heads issue building permits and run the day-to-day affairs of functioning towns. These 'cities' are represented in the local administration hierarchy as qisms affiliated to the nearest city proper. While NUCA is legally obliged to transfer these communities to mainstream local administration once they are developed, none have been since its inception in 1979. The other exception are new villages built by the Ministry of Agriculture's General Authority for Rehabilitation Projects and Agricultural Development (GARPAD) in its desert land reclamation schemes, which are initially under its jurisdiction and should eventually be transferred to local authorities.

At the highest tier, there are three city-state governorates, Cairo, Port Said, and Suez, where the governor is also head of the city and lower units are 100% urban. Alexandria is a quasi -city-state also with a merged city-governorate unit, though with one rural county (markaz). The other 23 governorates are formed of counties (marakiz, sing. markaz) composed of one city acting as the local administrative capital, overseeing other smaller cities (actually towns) as well as rural units (al-wihdat al-rifiyah) that are villages. The county-city heads (raies markaz wa madina) are appointed by the governor, where one county-city serves as the governorate capital and seat of the governor.

Two new governorates were created in April 2008: Helwan and 6th of October. In April 2011, however, the 6th of October and Helwan governorates were again incorporated into the Giza and Cairo Governorates, respectively. Luxor was created in December 2009, to be the 29th governorate of Egypt, but with the abolition of the 6th of October and Helwan governorates, the number of governorates has decreased to 27.

History
Before the 1952 Egyptian revolution, state penetration of the rural areas was limited by the power of local notables. Under Nasser, land reform reduced those notables' socioeconomic dominance, and the peasants were incorporated into cooperatives which transferred mass dependence from landlords to the government. The extension of officials into the countryside permitted the regime to bring development and services to the village. The local branches of the ruling party, the Arab Socialist Union (ASU), fostered a certain peasant political activism and coopted the local notables — in particular the village headmen — and checked their independence from the regime.

State penetration did not retreat under Sadat and Mubarak. The earlier effort to mobilize peasants and deliver services disappeared as the local party and cooperative withered, but administrative controls over the peasants remained intact. The local power of the old families and the headmen revived but more at the expense of peasants than of the state. The district police station balanced the notables, and the system of local government (the mayor and council) integrated them into the regime.

Until 1979, local government enjoyed limited power in Egypt's highly centralized state. Under the central government, there were twenty-six governorates (27 today), which were subdivided into counties (In   "center",), each of which was further subdivided into towns or villages. At each level, there was a governing structure that combined representative councils and government-appointed executive organs headed by governors, district officers, and mayors, respectively. Governors were appointed by the president, and they, in turn, appointed subordinate executive officers. The coercive backbone of the state apparatus ran downward from the Ministry of Interior through the governors' executive organs to the district police station and the village headman.

Sadat took several measures to administratively decentralize power to the provinces and towns, with limited fiscal and almost no political decentralisation. Governors acquired more authority under Law 43/1979, which reduced the administrative and budgetary controls of the central government over the provinces. The elected councils acquired, at least formally, the right to approve or disapprove the local budget. In an effort to reduce local demands on the central treasury, local government was given wider powers to raise local taxes. Local representative councils became vehicles of pressure for government spending, and the soaring deficits of local government bodies had to be covered by the central government. Local government was encouraged to enter into joint ventures with private investors, and these ventures stimulated an alliance between government officials and the local rich that paralleled the infitah alliance at the national level.

Under president Hosni Mubarak's rule (1981-2011), some scholars believed decentralization and local autonomy was achieved, and local policies often reflected special local conditions. Thus, officials in Upper Egypt often bowed to the powerful Islamic movement there, while those in the port cities struck alliances with importers." However, others found local governance proved impotent, with parliamentarians reduced to the roles of local councillors, lobbying at the parliamentary level for basic local services, while the elected Local Popular Councils (LPC) had a parallel ceremonial role to the appointed Local Executive Councils (LEC) that managed the local departments. Elections of the LPCs have also been observed to be fraudulent where the ruling National Democratic Party NDP won 95 percent of local council seats during the last election in 2008, and 84 percent of the seats were walkovers.

After Mubarak was deposed by the popular uprising of January 2011, parliament and local councils were dissolved pending the writing of a new constitution. The short-lived 2012 constitution and the current 2014 version gave wider local power through more decentralisation. However, till the end of 2022, it has not been implemented as the government has drawn out the process of drafting a new local administration law leaving LPC seats vacant for over a decade.

List of Governorates of Egypt

Demographics

Urban and rural populations

Data taken from CAPMAS:

Population density

Data taken from CAPMAS:. Information for population is in thousands, pop density - persons/km2 and area is in km2.

See also
List of governorates of Egypt by Human Development Index
Subdivisions of Egypt
Regional units of Egypt
List of Egyptian cities
List of political and geographic subdivisions by total area
ISO 3166-2:EG

References

External links
 Ministry of Local Development
 Ministry of Local Development (Archived defunct website 2006-2017)
 "Know Your Government", Tadamun Initiative
 Census Data and Maps (1996, 2006, 2017) 
  Egypt Administrative Divisions Map, The University of Texas at Austin Library
 History of administrative divisions in Egypt since the French Invasion  (in Arabic)

 
Subdivisions of Egypt
Egypt, Governorates
Egypt 1
Egypt 1
Governorates, Egypt
Lists of populated places in Egypt
Egypt